Hubbard is an unincorporated community in northwest Randolph County, Missouri.

The community is on a county road about one-quarter mile east of the Randolph-Chariton county line and two miles south of the Macon county line. The Thomas Hill Reservoir is two miles east.

History
A post office called Hubbard was established in 1886 and remained in operation until 1902. The community was named after a local merchant with the surname "Hubbard".

References

Unincorporated communities in Randolph County, Missouri
Unincorporated communities in Missouri